Psique y sexo is a 1965 Argentine anthology comedy drama film, consisting of four episodes each directed by Manuel Antín, Dino Minitti, Ernesto Bianco and Enrique Cahen Salaberry.

Cast
La estrella del destino
  Fernanda Mistral 
  Alberto Argibay
  Federico Luppi
La buscona
  Julia Sandoval
  Ernesto Bianco
 Emilio Guevara
La necrófila
  Zulma Faiad
  Tito Alonso
  Miguel Ligero
  Noemí Laserre
Chicos jugando al deseo
  Eddie Pequenino 
  Marisa Núñez
  Carlos Olivieri
  Fernando Crespi
  José Luis Mazza
  Carmen Llambí

External links
 

1965 films
1960s Spanish-language films
Argentine black-and-white films
Films directed by Enrique Cahen Salaberry
Argentine anthology films
1960s Argentine films